Alexei Yegorov may refer to:

 Alexei Yegorovich Yegorov (c.1776-1851), Russian painter
 Alexander Ilyich Yegorov (1883-1939), Soviet military commander and Marshal of the Soviet Union
 Alexander Valentinovich Yegorov (born 1951), Russian diplomat and ambassador
 Aleksey Yegorov (born 1975), Kazakhstani-Russian swimmer
 Alexei Yegorov (ice hockey, born 1975), Russian ice hockey player who played in the National Hockey League for the San Jose Sharks
 Alexei Yegorov (ice hockey, born 1976), Russian ice hockey goaltender who plays in the Kontinental Hockey League
 Aleksei Yuryevich Yegorov (ru) (born 1991), Russian boxer